Live at Carnegie Hall – 1969 is a live album by singer-songwriter Joni Mitchell, released on November 12, 2021, by Rhino Records. The album, which is the eighth overall release and the second live release of the Joni Mitchell Archives, features the storied, two-set recording that was captured at New York City's famed Carnegie Hall in 1969. This separate live album was pressed exclusively on vinyl, and serves as a companion to Joni Mitchell Archives – Vol. 2: The Reprise Years (1968–1971), the box set from which its material is derived.

Background and recording
Like its predecessor, Joni Mitchell Archives – Vol. 2: The Reprise Years (1968–1971) contains a number of recordings from Mitchell's personal archive, including a two-set recording of Joni's debut performance at the famed Carnegie Hall in New York City, New York on February 1, 1969. Her sold-out performance at the venue was attended by Bob Dylan and Graham Nash, and earned rave reviews in the press; Fred Kirby wrote in Billboard that Mitchell had "charmed a packed Carnegie Hall audience on Saturday ... Miss Mitchell doesn’t merely sing a song, the fine folk artist effectively interprets her material. And what a lineup of material! Beginning with 'Chelsea Morning' and ending with a medley of ‘The Circle Game’ and the new ‘Little Green,’ the outstanding material flowed."

While discussing her career during the 1970s for Archives – Vol. 2, Joni recalled to Cameron Crowe about the night of her performance, specifically her experience with her parents and their thoughts about her garb of choice:

In the liner notes for the vinyl release, Graham Nash also recounted his then-partner's clothing for her performance:

Mitchell's father defended her after her mother made the rags comment, saying she looked like a "queen" in her outfit. She was thankful for his support and love, and said he "gave back [herself]". The design of the bald eagle found on the front of Joni's jacket from that evening is etched into the vinyl on the set's sixth side.

Track listing
All tracks are written by Joni Mitchell, except where noted.

Personnel
Credits adapted from Discogs.

Performers
 Joni Mitchell – vocals; guitar

Production and recording
 Allison Boron – project assistance
 Tristan Calditaran – project assistance
 Sheryl Farber – project assistance
 Marcy Gensic – project assistance
 Bernie Grundman – mastering
 Mike Johnson – project assistance
 Joni Mitchell – reissue producer
 Tal Miller – project assistance
 Patrick Milligan – producer
 Susanne Savage – project assistance
 Mark Spector – project assistance

Design
 Joel Bernstein – photography
 Graham Nash – liner notes
 Doran Tyson – product manager
 Shannon Ward – packaging manager

Notes

References

Joni Mitchell albums
2021 albums